Contra Conspiracy (also known as Contra Control) is a 1988 action film written and directed by Thomas Dewier which is now distributed by Troma Entertainment.  The film was produced by City Lights.  The plot follows a Hollywood film crew shooting a movie in the Mojave Desert, only to be disrupted by a group of terrorists.

The film's plot bears a resemblance to the 2008 comedy Tropic Thunder.

External links

1988 films
1988 action films
American independent films
Troma Entertainment films
1988 independent films
1980s English-language films
1980s American films